The Poteau Work Center Residence No. 2 is a historic house at the Poteau District Headquarters of the Ouachita National Forest in Waldron, Arkansas.  It is a single-story wood-frame house, with a shallow-sloped gable roof and novelty siding.  Its central entry is sheltered by a porch supported by trios of columns.  The building was (along with the adjacent work center) built c. 1939 by a crew of the Civilian Conservation Corps.

The house was listed on the National Register of Historic Places in 1993.

See also
National Register of Historic Places listings in Scott County, Arkansas

References

Houses on the National Register of Historic Places in Arkansas
Houses completed in 1939
Buildings and structures in Scott County, Arkansas
Ouachita National Forest
National Register of Historic Places in Scott County, Arkansas
1939 establishments in Arkansas